Deanolis sublimbalis, the red banded mango caterpillar, is a moth of the family Crambidae. The species was first described by Pieter Cornelius Tobias Snellen in 1899. It is found in India (Sikkim, Darjeeling) and Indonesia (Sulawesi), Papua New Guinea, Myanmar, Thailand, China, Brunei and the Philippines. In 1990 it was first recorded in Australia in the Torres Strait and in 2001 it was detected on the Australian mainland in the Northern Peninsula Area at the tip of the Cape York Peninsula in Queensland.

The wingspan is about 20 mm. The forewings have a white ground colour interspersed with darker scales. The ground colour of the hindwings is white.

The larvae are a serious pest of Mangifera indica fruit, but have also been recorded feeding on Mangifera minor and Mangifera odorata. They hatch and burrow into the distal end of the mango fruit. Larvae pass through five instars within the fruit, with a larval development period of 14 to 20 days. Early instars feed on the fruit pulp forming a network of tunnels which may eventually cause the fruit to collapse. Later instars feed on the seed. Up to eleven larvae have been found in a single fruit, but there is mostly only one larva in a single fruit.

References

Moths described in 1899
Odontiinae